Gindi may refer to:

 Joginder Singh (field hockey) (1939–2002), Indian hockey player nicknamed Gindi
 Raymond Gindi, CEO of Century 21
 Sonny Gindi (1924–2012), co-founder of the department store Century 21

See also
 Nadia Al-Gindi (born 1946), Egyptian actress and producer
 Gindie, Queensland, Australia
 Gindis